The following lists the Maharajas of Mysore.

See also 
 Governors of Madras
 Governors of Tamil Nadu
 List of Governors of Karnataka
 Wadiyar dynasty

References 

Kingdom of Mysore
.
People of the Kingdom of Mysore
Mysore
Karnataka